Eugénie Pétain (née Hardon; 5 October 1877 – 30 January 1962) was the wife of the French military commander and political leader Philippe Pétain who ruled Vichy France between 1940 and 1944.

Pétain was her second husband. She had previously been married to François de Hérain, a doctor who later became an artist. Under pressure from her family she had initially rejected a marriage proposal from Pétain and instead wed de Hérain, but this marriage ended in divorce by 1914. Her son from her first marriage Pierre de Hérain became a film director.

She married Pétain on 14 September 1920, although their relationship had begun before this point and he was reported to have been at a hotel with her the night he was appointed to take command at the Battle of Verdun in 1916.

References

Bibliography
 Atkin, Nicolas. Petain. Routledge, 2014; 
 Buckingham, William F. Verdun 1916: The Deadliest Battle of the First World War. Amberley 2016.

1877 births
1962 deaths
People from Seine-et-Marne
Burials at Montparnasse Cemetery
Spouses of prime ministers of France